Kapil Dev Ramlal Nikhanj (Pronunciation: [kəpiːl deːʋ]; born 6 January 1959) is an Indian former cricketer. He was a fast-medium bowler and a hard-hitting middle-order batsman, and was named by Wisden as the Indian Cricketer of the Century in 2002.

Dev captained the Indian cricket team that won the 1983 Cricket World Cup, and in the process became the first Indian captain to win the Cricket World Cup, and is still the youngest captain (at the age of 24) to win the World Cup for any team. He retired in 1994, at the times of holding the world record for the highest number of wickets taken in Test cricket, a record subsequently broken by Courtney Walsh in 2000. At the time, he was also India's highest wicket-taker in both major forms of cricket, Tests and ODIs. He is the first player to take 200 ODI wickets. He is the only player in the history of cricket to have taken more than 400 wickets (434 wickets) and scored more than 5,000 runs in Tests, making him one of the greatest all-rounders in the history of cricket. Dev's all-round performance has been praised by cricketers including Sunil Gavaskar who regards him as one of the greatest all-rounders to play the game. He was the coach of the Indian national team between September 1999 and September 2000. On 11 March 2010, Dev was inducted into the ICC Cricket Hall of Fame. In 1982 awarded with the Padma Shri and in 1991 the Padma Bhushan.

Early life 
Kapildev Ramlal Nikhanj was born in a jat family from Punjab to his father Ram Lal Nikhanj, a teak merchant and his wife, Rajkumari in Chandigarh on 6 January 1959. His family moved to Fazilka after the Partition before eventually moving to Chandigarh. His paternal family is from Montgomery (now known as Sahiwal) and his mother was born in Pakpattan, Okara. Dev was a student at D.A.V. School.

Domestic career 
Kapil Dev made an impressive debut for Haryana in November 1975 against Punjab with a 6-wicket haul, restricting Punjab to just 63 runs and helping Haryana to victory. He finished the season with 121 wickets in 30 matches.

In the 1976–77 season opener against Jammu & Kashmir, he had a match haul of 8/36 in the win. While his contribution for the rest of that season was ordinary, Haryana qualified for the pre-quarterfinals. Dev achieved his then best innings haul of 8/20 in just 9 overs in the second innings to skittle Bengal for 58 runs in under 19 overs. Haryana lost to Bombay in the quarter-finals.

He began his 1977–78 season claiming 8/38 in the first innings against Services. With 3 wickets in the second innings, he took his maiden 10-wicket haul in first-class cricket, a feat he would later achieve twice in Test cricket. With 23 wickets in 4 matches, he was selected for the Irani Trophy, Duleep Trophy and Wills Trophy matches.

In the 1978–79 season, Haryana had a repeat encounter with Bengal in the pre-quarterfinal match after a lackluster season from Dev (12 wickets from 4 matches). He scored 2 half-centuries in the group stage matches. In the pre-quarterfinal match, he took a 5-wicket haul in the first innings. Poor batting by Haryana in the second innings let Bengal avenge their loss from 2 seasons back by scoring the required 161 runs for the loss of just 4 wickets. Dev stood out in the Irani Trophy match, scoring 62 runs and coming in at number 8. He took 5 catches in the game where Karnataka was defeated by the Rest of India XI. Dev arrived in the national spotlight with a standout performance in the finals of the Duleep Trophy, taking a first-innings haul of 7/65 in 24 overs. He was included in the North Zone squad for Deodhar Trophy and Wills Trophy for the first time. He played his first Test match in the season against Pakistan.

In the 1979–80 season, Dev showed his batting talent with a maiden century against Delhi when he scored his career-best 193. In the pre-quarterfinal match, where he captained Haryana for the first time against Uttar Pradesh, he took a five-wicket haul in the second innings to advance to quarterfinals, where they lost to Karnataka. With Dev cementing his place in the Indian national squad, his appearances in domestic matches dwindled.

1990–91 Ranji Champions 
In the 1990–91 Ranji season, Haryana rode into the semi-finals on the back of the bowling performance of Chetan Sharma and the batting performance of Amarjit Kaypee. Dev took center stage in the semi-final against Bengal, where he led his team to a Mammoth score of 605 runs by scoring 141 as well as taking 5 wickets.

The finals of the 1991 season will be remembered for the number of international cricketers who participated, including Kapil Dev, Chetan Sharma, Ajay Jadeja and Vijay Yadav turning up for Haryana and Bombay cricket team represented by Sanjay Manjrekar, Vinod Kambli, Sachin Tendulkar, Dilip Vengsarkar, Chandrakant Pandit, Salil Ankola and Abey Kuruvilla. Deepak Sharma (199), Ajay Jadeja (94), and Chetan Sharma (98) helped Haryana to a score of 522 while Yogendra Bhandari (5 wickets) and Dev (3 wickets) restricted Bombay to 410 runs in the first innings. A crucial 41 from Dev and top scorer Banerjee (60) took Haryana to 242 runs, setting Bombay a target of 355 runs. After the initial wickets, Vengsarkar (139) and Tendulkar (96) fought back for the Bombay team. After Tendulkar's dismissal, Haryana took the final 6 wickets for 102 runs and Vengsarkar and Bombay were stranded 3 runs short of the target. Dev won his maiden and only Ranji Trophy championship.

County Cricket 
Kapil Dev played county cricket in England Northamptonshire between 1981 and 1983 and for Worcestershire during the 1984 and 1985 seasons. He played a total of 40 first-class matches in his county stint, and made 2,312 runs across 64 innings with four centuries and 14 half-centuries. Out of his 835 overall first-class wickets, 103 of those wickets came in county cricket.

International career

Early years (1978–1982) 
Dev made his Test cricket debut in Faisalabad, Pakistan on 16 October 1978. Although his match figures were unimpressive, the numbers did not convey any measure of his contribution. He startled the Pakistani batsmen with his pace and bouncers that struck their helmets on more than one occasion. Dev captured his maiden wicket of Sadiq Mohammad with his trademark outswinger. He showcased his all-rounder talent when he scored India's fastest Test half-century off 33 balls and 2 sixes in each of the innings during the 3rd Test match at National Stadium, Karachi, although India lost the match and the series 2–0. In the ensuing series against a visiting West Indies team, he scored his maiden Test century (126) at Feroz Shah Kotla, Delhi in just 124 balls and had a steady bowling performance (17 wickets at 33.00). Ominous signs of Dev's liking for England showed up in the ensuring series, his first outside the sub-continent. He picked up his first 5-wicket haul and all of England's wickets, although it came at a huge cost (48 overs and 146 runs conceded) as England scored a mammoth 633 and won the match comfortably. Dev finished the series with 16 wickets though his batting haul of 45 runs (Average: 7.5) was unimpressive. His debut in ODI Cricket happened in the earlier tour of Pakistan where his individual performance was ordinary and it stayed the same as both Dev and India had a poor campaign at the 1979 Cricket World Cup.

Dev established himself as India's premier fast bowler when he took two 5-wicket hauls and ended the home series against Australia with 28 wickets (Average: 22.32) and also 212 runs that included a half-century. He gained fame in the 6-Test home series against Pakistan in the 1979–80 season when he led India to 2 victories against the visitors – once with the bat (69) at Wankhede Stadium, Bombay and the second time with bat and ball (10-wicket haul in match – 4/90 in the first innings and 7/56 in the second innings, 84 in 98 balls with his bat) at Chepauk, Madras (Now Chennai). Dev rates his all-round performance in this match as his career best and his second innings figure of 7/56 was his best to-date. During the series, he also became the youngest Test player to achieve the all-round double of 100 Wickets and 1000 Runs and in 25 matches (although Ian Botham took just 21 matches to achieve the same feat) and finished the series with 32 wickets (Ave: 17.68) and 278 runs that included 2 fifties.

India's tour of Australia in 1980–81 had the looks of the familiar Indian series as India were 1–0 down and were defending a meagre 143 runs and Dev virtually ruled out with a groin injury. When Australia finished the fourth day at 18/3, Dev willed himself to play the final day with pain-killing injections and removed the dangerous Australia middle order. Dev won the match for India with the innings bowling performance of 16.4–4–28–5, a bowling performance that figures in his five best bowling performance. During the Australian tour, he scored his first fifty in ODIs against New Zealand at Brisbane. Somehow India's Test cricket sensation was unable to adjust to ODI cricket and had a career start of 278 runs (Average: 17.38) and 17 wickets after 16 ODI matches.

A dismal New Zealand tour later, Dev was ready for the 1981–82 home series against England where his five-wicket haul won the first test at Wankhede Stadium, Bombay. He scored 318 runs (Average: 53, 1 century, 1 fifty) and took 22 wickets (2 5-wicket hauls) and walked away with the Man of the Series honours. England saw more of Dev in the ensuing series at home against the Indian cricket team in the 1982 season when he opened with a 5-wicket haul and 130 runs in a losing cause at Lord's. He finished the 3-match series with 292 runs (Ave: 73, 3 fifties) and 10 Wickets and bagged the Man of the Series again.

Facing Sri Lanka for the first time, Dev helped himself to a five-wicket haul to kick start the 1982–83 season. In the following tour to Pakistan, Dev and Mohinder Amarnath were the only bright spots in a series dominated by rival all-rounder Imran Khan (40 wickets and 1 century). Dev took a 5/102 haul in the second Test at National Stadium, Karachi, 7/220 in the third Test at Iqbal Stadium, Faisalabad and 8/85 at Gaddafi Stadium, Lahore while he received little support from other team members. After this disastrous tour, Dev was made the captain of the Indian cricket team in place of Sunil Gavaskar.

Captain: 1983 World Cup Champions (1982–1984) 
Dev debuted as India's captain in the 1982–83 season against Sri Lanka (before the Pakistan tour) when Gavaskar was rested. His first assignment as regular captain was the tour of West Indies, where the biggest accomplishment was a lone ODI victory. Dev (72) and Gavaskar (90) led India to a huge score – 282/5 in 47 overs and Dev's 2 wickets aided India to restrict West Indies for 255 and a victory that Indian cricketers claim gave them the confidence to face the West Indies team in 1983 Cricket World Cup. Overall, Dev had a good series in West Indies as he scored a century to save the second test match as well as picking up 17 wickets (Average: 24.94).

1983 World Cup performance 
Dev entered the World Cup with an ordinary individual record – 32 Matches, 608 Runs (Average: 21), 34 wickets. India's solitary victory in the previous two World Cups was against East Africa in 1975. Riding on Yashpal Sharma (89 Runs), Roger Binny and Ravi Shastri (3 wickets each), India inflicted the West Indies' first-ever defeat in the World Cup. Following a victory against Zimbabwe, India lost the next two matches – Australia (despite Dev's best career figures of 5/43) and West Indies. India now needed victories against Australia and Zimbabwe to advance to the semifinals.

India faced Zimbabwe at Nevill Ground, Royal Tunbridge Wells on 18 June 1983. After falling behind, Dev, batting with the lower order batsmen, stabilised the side with help from Roger Binny (22 runs) and Madan Lal. Dev scored his century off 72 balls. Together with Kirmani (24 runs), Dev put on an unbeaten 126 runs for the 9th wicket – a world record that stood unbroken for 27 years (10,000 days), and finished not out with 175 runs off 138 balls, an innings that included 16 boundaries and 6 sixes. The innings figures in the Top 10 ODI Batting Performances at No. 4. India won the match by 31 runs.

India faced the English cricket team in the semifinals. Dev helped curtail the lower order after England lost regular wickets to Binny and Amarnath. He took 3 wickets as India limited England to 213 and the middle order of Amarnath (46 runs), Yashpal Sharma (61) and Sandeep Patil (51*) ensured victory and entry into the finals to take on the West Indies cricket team who were looking for a hat-trick of World Cup titles. West Indies restricted India for 183 runs, with only Krishnamachari Srikkanth (38 runs) providing some scoring relief. Despite losing Gordon Greenidge, West Indies steadied their innings to 57/2 on the back of quick scoring by Viv Richards. Richards played one too many aggressive shots when he skied a pull shot from Madan Lal that Dev caught at deep square leg after running backward for over 20 yards. The catch is attributed as the turning point in the 1983 WC Final and is regarded as one of the finest in ODI Cricket. West Indies collapsed from 50/1 to 76/6 and finally were bowled out for 140 with Dev picking up the wicket of Andy Roberts and Mohinder Amarnath picking up the final wicket of Michael Holding. The win was India's maiden World Cup and he led with 303 runs (Average: 60.6), 12 wickets (Average: 20.41) and 7 catches in 8 matches.sachin tendulkar also inspired by him.

Post-World Cup 
After the World Cup, India hosted the West Indies cricket team and lost the Test series 3–0 and the ODI Series 5–0. Dev achieved his best test bowling performance in a loss at Motera Stadium, Ahmedabad with a return of 9/83. His bowling performance in the test and ODI series was let down by his poor batting performance. The selectors ended Dev's reign by reappointing Gavaskar as captain in early 1984.

Return to captaincy 
Dev was reappointed captain in March 1985 and guided India on a Test series win over England in 1986. This period saw one of his most famous matches, the second Tied Test, in which he was named joint-man of the match with Australian batsman Dean Jones.

He was retained as captain for the 1987 Cricket World Cup. In their first match, Australia scored 268 against India. However, after the close of innings, Dev agreed with the umpires that the score should be increased to 270 as one boundary during the innings had been mistakenly signalled as a four and not a six. In their reply, India scored 269 falling short of Australia's score by one run. In the Wisden Cricketer's Almanack, it was reported that "Kapil Dev's sportsmanship proved the deciding factor in a close-run match". India went on to reach the semi-final of the 1987 World Cup, where they lost to England. Dev faced the blame for India's defeat as he holed out to deep mid-wicket triggering a collapse that led to the unexpected loss. He did not captain India again, although he was the Vice-captain for India's tour to Pakistan in 1989.

The captaincy period was on the whole a difficult one for him as it was mired with reports of differences with Gavaskar, as well as his own inconsistent form as a bowler. However, both men later insisted that these reports were exaggerated. Dev's performance as Captain was better than as a player.

Skills 
Dev was a right-arm pace bowler noted for his graceful action and potent outswinger, and was India's main strike bowler for most of his career. He developed a fine inswinging yorker during the 1980s, which he used very effectively against tail-enders. As a batsman, he was a natural striker of the ball who could hook and drive effectively. A naturally aggressive player, he often helped India in difficult situations by taking the attack to the opposition. Nicknamed The Haryana Hurricane, he represented the Haryana cricket team in domestic cricket.

Bowling style 
Dev was a fast bowler. However, a fluent run-up and a gather that was perfectly side-on at the time of delivery meant that the outswinger came naturally to him. Usually bowled at a length and direction that always troubled right-handers, his delivery was the bane of most of his victims as he sought to beat the bat on the outside edge, either caught on the off-side cordon or indeed LBW and bowled in case the ball missed the edge. The side-on action meant that, for the first few years, this was the only delivery he could bowl. The deliveries that held their lines or came into the right-hander came through natural variations off the pitch. However, as he gained maturity, the action became less side-on and he developed an inswinger too. He noted in the mid-1980s that the only delivery he could not bowl at will was the leg-cutter.

By the end of 1983, Dev already had about 250 Test wickets in just five years and looked well on his way to becoming one of the most prolific wicket-takers ever. However, his bowling declined following knee surgery in 1984, as he lost some of his jump at the crease. Despite this setback, he never missed playing a single test or one-day game on fitness grounds. Though he lost some of his bite, he remained an effective bowler for another ten years and became the second bowler ever to take 400 wickets in Test cricket in 1991–92 when he took Mark Taylor's wicket in a series versus Australia in Australia. In that Australian tour he took 25 wickets.

Final years 
Dev continued as India's lead pace bowler under a succession of captains in the early 1990s. He was involved in a notable incident during the Lord's Test Match of 1990, when he hit off-spinner Eddie Hemmings for four sixes in succession to take India past the follow-on target. This match featured the highest test score by an Englishman against India, 333 by Graham Gooch. Dev was cited by umpire Dickie Bird as being one of the greatest all-rounders of all time.

He became a valuable batsman in the ODI version of the game, as a pinch-hitter used to accelerate the run-scoring rate, usually in the final ten overs, and was relied upon to stabilize the innings in the event of a collapse. He played in the 1992 Cricket World Cup, his last, under the captaincy of Mohammad Azharuddin and topped the batting strike rate with 125.80 runs per 100 balls. He led the bowling attack with younger talents like Javagal Srinath and Manoj Prabhakar, who would eventually succeed him as India's leading pace bowlers. He retired in 1994, after breaking Richard Hadlee's then standing record for the most Test wickets taken.

List of centuries by opponent

Post-retirement

National coach 

Kapil Dev was appointed coach of the Indian national cricket team in 1999, succeeding Anshuman Gaekwad. In his term, India won just one test match (at home against New Zealand) and had two major series losses in Australia (3–0) and at home against South Africa (2–0) and in general his term was considered a disappointment. At the height of the match fixing allegation by Manoj Prabhakar, a charge that was dismissed later, Dev resigned from his position as national coach. Stung by the betting controversy, he announced his farewell stating that "I bid adieu to the game that gave me so much and then took a great deal of it away on the mere hearsay of a third party". After a brief interval, he was succeeded as coach by former New Zealand batsman John Wright, who became India's first foreign coach.

Return 
After a period of silence away from the public eye, Dev returned to cricket when Wisden announced him as one of the sixteen finalists for the Wisden Indian Cricketer of the Century award in July 2002. Dev pipped longtime teammate Gavaskar and crowd favourite Tendulkar to win the award and claimed the moment as "my finest hour".

Dev slowly returned to cricket as a bowling consultant and was the bowling coach in the preparatory camp prior to India's tour of Pakistan in March 2004. In October 2006, he was nominated as the chairman of National Cricket Academy for a two-year period.

In 2005, he acted in a brief role in the cult film Iqbal written by Vipul K. Rawal where he played himself. Initially the director was not keen on approaching him; however, writer Rawal insisted as the role was written with him in mind.

In May 2007, Dev joined the upstart Indian Cricket League (ICL) floated by Zee TV as the chairman of executive board, defending his decision as complimenting BCCI's structure rather than opposing it – "We are not looking to create a rival team but helping the Indian board to find more talent". In June 2007, BCCI responded by revoking the pension for all players who had joined ICL, including Dev. On 21 August 2007, Dev was removed from the chairmanship of the National Cricket Academy, a day after he addressed a formal press conference of the new Indian Cricket League.

On 25 July 2012 Dev resigned from ICL and continued to support BCCI, thereby paving way to get back into the BCCI fold.

Joining Territorial Army 
On 24 September 2008, Dev joined the Indian Territorial Army and was commissioned as a Lieutenant Colonel by General Deepak Kapoor, Chief of the Army Staff. He joined as an honorary officer.

Chancellor of Haryana's Sports University 
He was appointed as first chancellor of the Sports University of Haryana in 2019. The university is situated in India's Haryana state which he represented in domestic cricket.

Personal life 
Dev married Romi Bhatia in 1980 with whom he has a daughter, Amiya Dev, born on 16 January 1996.

In 1993, Dev took up golf. Dev was the only Asian founding member of Laureus Foundation in 2000. Ian Botham and Viv Richards were the other two cricketers on the founding member council of 40. Steve Waugh was added to the academy members in 2006 when it was expanded from 40 to 42. He pledged his organs during an event organised by Delhi Urological Society on 31 January 2014 at the Airport Authority of India, Officers Club, New Delhi.

On 23 October 2020, Dev suffered a heart attack and was hospitalised. He underwent an emergency coronary angioplasty at a hospital in Delhi.

Books 
He has written four books – three autobiographical and one book on Sikhism. Autobiographical works include — By God's Decree which came out in 1985, Cricket My Style in 1987, and Straight from the Heart in 2004. His latest book titled We, The Sikhs was released in 2019.

Records

Captaincy record

Test matches 
Source:

One Day Internationals 
Source:

Test cricket 
 In early 1994, he became the highest Test wicket-taker in the world, breaking the record held by Sir Richard Hadlee. Dev's record was broken by Courtney Walsh in 1999.
 Only player to have achieved the all-rounder's double of 4,000 Test runs and 400 Test wickets

Filmography 
C.I.D. (Season 1) Episode- Howzzat?  (Episode 289,290) as Himself
 Mujhse Shaadi Karogi (2004) as Himself
 Iqbal (2005) as Himself
 Chain Kulii Ki Main Kulii (2007) as Himself
 83 (film) (2021) as Himself and also portrayed by Ranveer Singh
 Double XL (2022) as Himself

Achievements

Awards 
 1979–80 – Arjuna Award
 1982 – Padma Shri
 1983 – Wisden Cricketer of the Year
 1991 – Padma Bhushan
 2002 – Wisden Indian Cricketer of the Century
 2010 – ICC Cricket Hall of Fame
 2013 – The 25 Greatest Global Living Legends in India by NDTV
 2013 – CK Nayudu Lifetime Achievement award(announced)
 2019 – Bharat Gaurav Award

In popular culture 
Dev made cameo appearances in the films Dillagi... Yeh Dillagi, Iqbal, Chain Khuli ki Main Khuli and Mujhse Shaadi Karogi among others. He has also released a song "One India My India" with Shailendra Singh.

The 2016 Indian film Azhar, directed by Tony D'Souza, revolves around Match fixing scandals in late 90s and 2000. In the film Dev's character was played by Varun Badola. Indian filmmaker Kabir Khan directed a biopic film, titled 83, about India's first world cup win in 1983. The film features Ranveer Singh as Dev and is produced by Anurag Kashyap and Kapil Dev has a cameo as a spectator.

References

External links 
 
 

1959 births
Living people
Coaches of the Indian national cricket team
Cricketers at the 1979 Cricket World Cup
Cricketers at the 1983 Cricket World Cup
Cricketers at the 1987 Cricket World Cup
Cricketers at the 1992 Cricket World Cup
Cricketers from Chandigarh
Cricketers who have acted in films
Haryana cricketers
India One Day International cricketers
India Test cricket captains
India Test cricketers
Indian cricket administrators
Indian cricket coaches
Indian cricket commentators
Indian cricketers
North Zone cricketers
Northamptonshire cricketers
One Day International hat-trick takers
Punjabi people
Recipients of the Arjuna Award
Recipients of the Padma Bhushan in sports
Recipients of the Padma Shri in sports
Wisden Cricketers of the Year
Wisden Leading Cricketers in the World
Worcestershire cricketers